Ankit Tiwari (born 18 September 1989) is an Indian cricketer. He made his Twenty20 debut for Uttar Pradesh in the 2012–13 Syed Mushtaq Ali Trophy on 17 March 2013.

References

External links
 

1989 births
Living people
Indian cricketers
Uttar Pradesh cricketers
Cricketers from Allahabad